In mathematics and theoretical computer science the Lawson topology, named after Jimmie D. Lawson, is a topology on partially ordered sets used in the study of domain theory. The lower topology on a poset P is generated by the subbasis consisting of all complements of principal filters on P. The Lawson topology on P is the smallest common refinement of the lower topology and the Scott topology on P.

Properties 

 If P is a complete upper semilattice, the Lawson topology on P is always a complete T1 topology.

See also
Formal ball

References
 G. Gierz, K. H. Hofmann, K. Keimel, J. D. Lawson, M. Mislove, D. S. Scott (2003), Continuous Lattices and Domains, Encyclopedia of Mathematics and its Applications, Cambridge University Press.

External links 
"How Do Domains Model Topologies?," Paweł Waszkiewicz, Electronic Notes in Theoretical Computer Science 83 (2004)

Domain theory
General topology
Order theory